Wooly Bully is the debut studio album by the band Sam the Sham and the Pharaohs; released in 1965 on MGM Records SE-4297 (stereo). It was released following the success of their hit "Wooly Bully", and contains a mixture of cover songs and original compositions. It is an early example of Tex-Mex music that was also being popularized by groups like Sir Douglas Quintet, Freddy Fender and ? and the Mysterians.

The song "Wooly Bully" was recorded at Phillips Recording Service in Memphis, which was owned by Sam Phillips.

Reception
The album reached No. 26 on the Billboard albums chart on August 28, 1965. Allmusic's Eugene Chadbourne gives it a -star rating, writing that the band performed originals and cover songs with equal skill and the album was worth hearing beyond the hit song "Wooly Bully".

Track listing

Side one
"Wooly Bully" (Domingo Samudio) – 2:20
"The Memphis Beat" (Milton Addington, Allen Reynolds) – 2:09
"I Found Love" (Alonzo Tucker, Jackie Wilson) – 2:10
"Go-Go Girls" (David Martin) – 2:13
"Every Woman I Know (Crazy 'Bout An Auto)" (Billy "The Kid" Emerson) – 2:17 
"Haunted House" (Robert Geddins) – 3:10

Side two
"Juímonos (Let's Went)" (Samudio) – 2:30 
"Shotgun" (Autry DeWalt II) – 2:50   
"Sorry 'Bout That" (Stan Kesler, Gary McEwen) –  1:55 
"Gangster of Love" (Johnny "Guitar" Watson) – 2:18
"Mary Lee" (Samudio) – 2:23
"Long Tall Sally" (Robert "Bumps" Blackwell, Enotris Johnson, Richard Penniman) – 1:45

Personnel

Musicians

 Domingo "Sam" Samudio – Farfisa organ, vocals
 Ray Stinnett – guitar
 Butch Gibson – saxophone
 David A. Martin – bass guitar (died 1987)
 Jerry Patterson – drums, percussion

Technical
Stan Kesler – producer
Val Valentin – engineer
 Bill Webb – photography
 Joy Webb – photography

Charting history
Album – Billboard (United States)

Singles – Billboard (United States)

References

1965 debut albums
MGM Records albums
Rock-and-roll albums